Calaboose may be:
 another word for prison
 Calaboose (film), a 1943 film

See also